Ukraine competed at the 2012 Winter Youth Olympics in Innsbruck, Austria.

Some of the athletes later represented Ukraine at the Winter Olympics. Oleksii Krasovskyi (cross-country skiing) and Olena Stetskiv (luge) competed at the 2014, 2018, 2022 Winter Olympics. Anastasiya Merkushyna (biathlon), Aleksandra Nazarova and Maxim Nikitin (both figure skating), Anton Dukach (luge) competed at the 2018 and 2022 Winter Olympics. Dmytro Mytsak (alpine skiing) represented Ukraine at the 2014 Winter Olympics. Yaroslav Paniot (figure skating) represented Ukraine at the 2018 Winter Olympics.

Medalists

Alpine skiing

Ukraine qualified 2 athletes.

Boys

Girls

Biathlon

Ukraine qualified 4 athletes.

Boys

Girls

Mixed

Cross-country skiing

Ukraine qualified 2 athletes.

Boys

Girls

Sprint

Mixed

Figure skating

Ukraine qualified 6 athletes.

Boys

Girls

Pairs

Mixed

Luge

Ukraine qualified 6 athletes.

Boys

Girls

Team

Nordic combined

Ukraine qualified 1 athlete.

Boys

Short track

Ukraine qualified 1 athlete.

Girls

Mixed

Ski jumping

Ukraine qualified 1 athlete.

Boys

See also
Ukraine at the 2012 Summer Olympics

References

2012 in Ukrainian sport
Nations at the 2012 Winter Youth Olympics
2012